The Fayette Street Bridge is a bridge that connects Conshohocken with West Conshohocken, Pennsylvania across the Schuylkill River.  This bridge is also known as the Matsonford Bridge.

References

See also

 
 
 
 List of crossings of the Schuylkill River

Bridges in Montgomery County, Pennsylvania
Transportation in Montgomery County, Pennsylvania
Road bridges in Pennsylvania